The Wendy's Champions Skins Game was an unofficial golf tournament on the Champions Tour. It was played annually in January/February in Maui, Hawaii at Kaanapali Golf Resort (Royal Kaanapali Golf Course). Wendy's was the main sponsor of the tournament.  Before that, from 2001 through 2007, it was played at the Wailea Golf Club in Maui on their Gold Course.

The tournament was founded in 1988 as the Senior Skins Game. It was played in a skins game format where each hole, and the money or "skin" associated with it, was won by one player only if they win that hole outright. If no player won the hole, the "skin" carried over to the next hole. From 1988 to 2005, it was played as an individual event with four players (five in 1991). Beginning in 2006, it was played as an alternate-shot two-man team event with four teams.

The tournament was discontinued in December 2011. The purse for the final tournament in 2011 was US$770,000.

Winners
Team event (2006–2011)

Individual event (1988–2005)

References

External links
PGATOUR.com tournament site

Former PGA Tour Champions events
Golf in Hawaii
Sports in Maui
Recurring sporting events established in 1988
Recurring sporting events disestablished in 2011
1988 establishments in Hawaii
2011 disestablishments in Hawaii